Henig may refer to:

People
Martin Henig, British archaeologist
Michael Henig (born 1985), American football quarterback
Robin Marantz Henig, American science writer
Ruth Henig, Baroness Henig (born 1943), British historian and politician
Sheila Henig (1934–1979), Canadian pianist and soprano
Stanley Henig (born 1939), British academic and politician

Places
Henig, a village in Berghin Commune, Alba County, Romania
Henig, tributary of the river Secaș in Romania